The 1881 Rhode Island gubernatorial election was held on April 6, 1881. Incumbent Republican Alfred H. Littlefield defeated Democratic nominee Horace A. Kimball with 66.97% of the vote.

General election

Candidates
Major party candidates
Alfred H. Littlefield, Republican
Horace A. Kimball, Democratic

Other candidates
Charles P. Adams, Greenback
Frank G. Allen, Prohibition

Results

References

1881
Rhode Island
Gubernatorial